The arrondissement of Châteaubriant is a former arrondissement of France in the Loire-Atlantique department in the Pays de la Loire region. In January 2017 it was merged into the new arrondissement of Châteaubriant-Ancenis. It had 53 communes, and its population was 126,603 (2012).

Composition

The communes of the arrondissement of Châteaubriant, and their INSEE codes, were:

History

The arrondissement of Châteaubriant was created in 1800. It was disbanded in 2017. As a result of the reorganisation of the cantons of France which came into effect in 2015, the borders of the cantons are no longer related to the borders of the arrondissements. The cantons of the arrondissement of Châteaubriant were, as of January 2015:

 Blain
 Châteaubriant
 Derval
 Guémené-Penfao
 Moisdon-la-Rivière
 Nort-sur-Erdre
 Nozay
 Rougé
 Saint-Julien-de-Vouvantes
 Saint-Nicolas-de-Redon

References

Chateaubriant